Olfactory receptor 1D2 is a protein that in humans is encoded by the OR1D2 gene.

Olfactory receptors interact with odorant molecules in the nose, to initiate a neuronal response that triggers the perception of a smell. The olfactory receptor proteins are members of a large family of G-protein-coupled receptors (GPCR) arising from single coding-exon genes. Olfactory receptors share a 7-transmembrane domain structure with many neurotransmitter and hormone receptors and are responsible for the recognition and G protein-mediated transduction of odorant signals. The olfactory receptor gene family is the largest in the genome. The nomenclature assigned to the olfactory receptor genes and proteins for this organism is independent of other organisms.

Expression
As well as bring expressed in the olfactory epithelium of the human nose, OR1D2 is special in that it is also expressed in human spermatozoa, where it is involved in sperm chemotaxis.

Ligands
Bourgeonal is a reported ligand for OR1D2 that affects sperm chemotaxis.

Ligands include:
 Bourgeonal
 Canthoxal
 Cyclamal
 Floralazone
 Lilial
 Phenylacetaldehyde
 3-phenylbutyraldehyde
 3-phenylpropionaldehyde
 4-phenylbutyraldehyde
 (p-tert-butylphenoxy)acetaldehyde

See also
 Olfactory receptor

References

Further reading

External links 
 

Olfactory receptors